Saint-Cast-le-Guildo (Gallo: Saent-Cast-le-Giledo) is a commune in the Côtes-d'Armor department of Brittany in northwestern France. It is port city on the English Channel as it also has a nautical center, the Centre Nautique de Saint-Cast (CNSC) ranked 3rd to 6th in the nation.

The river Arguenon flows through the commune, where it empties into the sea.

History
The Battle of St Cast took place on September 11, 1758, when the French repelled the English. The English first attacked the region of Dinard by sea, but were stopped at the Rance by the Vauban fortifications. They were forced to retreat to their fleet in front of St-Cast, where Emmanuel-Armand de Richelieu  was waiting for them and launched an attack on the beach while the British were fleeing back onto their vessels. The casualties were heavy for the British army as they lost 1,160 soldiers: the French lost about 445  men Today there is a monument in the Bourg (neighborhood of St-Cast) showing a greyhound defeating a lion; the Castins 	 defeating a lion (the English symbol).

Population
Inhabitants of Saint-Cast-le-Guildo are called castins in French. In 1971 the former commune of Notre-Dame-de-Guildo was absorbed into Saint-Cast-le-Guildo.

Food
Saint-Cast features many of the typical dishes of Breton cuisine, such as the Kouign-amann, or the local specialty, Le Castin, which is originally what we call people from there, or in this case the cake.

Notable people
 Lucienne Heuvelmans (1881–1944), sculptor and illustrator
 Irène Aïtoff (1904–2006), classical pianist and vocal coach
 Anne Beaumanoir (1923–2022), neurophysiologist, one of the Righteous Among the Nations

Climate
Saint-Cast-le-Guildo has a oceanic climate (Köppen climate classification Cfb).

See also
Communes of the Côtes-d'Armor department
https://sites.google.com/site/alderneylocalhistory/Home/1700s/1758-battle-of-st-cast

References

External links
Tourist office website 
Official city website

Communes of Côtes-d'Armor